Terry W. Wilson (September 3, 1923 – March 30, 1999) was an American actor most noted for his role as "Bill Hawks", the assistant trail master, in all 267 episodes of the NBC and ABC western television series, Wagon Train, which aired from 1957 to 1965.

Life and career
Wilson appeared in more than thirty-five films and television programs between 1948 and 1981. Many of his early roles were uncredited. On July 2, 1953, he was cast as a stagecoach guard in episode 121, "Woman from Omaha", of The Lone Ranger. In 1956, he had another uncredited role as a robber in the ABC/Warner Brothers western series, Cheyenne, the first television western in an hour-long format, starring Clint Walker.

Wilson was with Wagon Train for the entire run and worked with all the other stars on the program, including Ward Bond, Robert Horton, John McIntire, Robert Fuller, Frank McGrath, Denny Miller, and Michael Burns.

After Wagon Train, Wilson appeared in several other westerns, including ABC's short-lived Custer and Hondo in 1967, in Don Knotts' The Shakiest Gun in the West in 1968, the film Dirty Dingus Magee in 1970, in four episodes of NBC's The Virginian/The Men from Shiloh starring James Drury in 1970 and 1971, in the James Garner picture Support Your Local Gunfighter in 1971, once on CBS's Gunsmoke in 1972, twice in Richard Boone's Hec Ramsey in 1973 and 1974, and as Judge Lennon in the episode "Counterall" of Buddy Ebsen's CBS detective series, Barnaby Jones.

Wilson portrayed Biff Jenkins in the 1975 Walt Disney film Escape to Witch Mountain. His last acting role was as Norman Scroggs in a 1981 episode of CBS's The Dukes of Hazzard.

In his early years, Wilson was a stunt performer for John Wayne in such films as Sands of Iwo Jima in 1949 and Rio Grande in 1950, (see below for more). He was part of the John Ford stock troupe and appeared as an uncredited extra in numerous dance scenes. He often appeared with his friend and fellow stunt performer Frank McGrath. In 1957, Ward Bond specifically requested Wilson and McGrath to be regulars on Wagon Train. When Bond died, it was Wilson who broke the news to Bond's best friend, John Wayne. He said, "Hold on ... Ward just dropped dead".  It has been said that they both cried together on the phone.  Wilson, along with John Wayne, McGrath, Harry Carey, Jr. (Dobe), and Ken Curtis, later Festus Haggen on Gunsmoke, were Bond's pallbearers.

Along with McGrath, Wilson appears in a dance scene as a Texas Ranger and both are in the "wedding party" in the John Wayne/John Ford film The Searchers. In Hondo, Frank McGrath has a speaking part, and Wilson doubles for John Wayne in the knife fight with the Indian Silva.

Wilson and his wife are interred at Pierce Brothers Valley Oaks Memorial Park in Westlake Village in Los Angeles County. They had three children.

Filmography

References

External links

1923 births
1999 deaths
American male film actors
American male television actors
American stunt performers
Male actors from Los Angeles
Male actors from California
People from Canoga Park, Los Angeles
People from Huntington Park, California
20th-century American male actors
Burials at Valley Oaks Memorial Park
Western (genre) television actors